Orestias elegans is a species of orchid. It is found in São Tomé and Príncipe. It is the type species of its genus.

References

 

Malaxidinae
Orchids of Africa
Plants described in 1887